Novi Pazar may refer to:

Novi Pazar, town in Serbia
Novi Pazar, Shumen Province, town in Bulgaria
Novi Pazar, Kardzhali Province, village in Bulgaria